Franciscan Church ( is the name of several churches belonging to the Franciscans, e.g.:

Austria
Franciscan Church, Eisenstadt
Franciscan Church, Graz
Franciscan Church, Salzburg
Franciscan Church, Vienna

Germany

Franciscan Church, Ingolstadt
Franciscan Church, Überlingen

Hungary

Franciscan Church, Budapest
Franciscan Church, Eger
Franciscan Church, Gyöngyös
Franciscan Church, Szeged

Poland

St. Francis of Assisi's Church, Kraków
Franciscan Church, Zamość

Romania

Cluj-Napoca Franciscan Church

Serbia

Franciscan Church, Bač

Slovakia

Franciscan Church, Bratislava
St Anthony of Padua Church, Košice
Franciscan Church, Trnava

Slovenia

Franciscan Church of the Annunciation

Switzerland

Franciscan Church, Lucerne
Franciscan Church, Solothurn